Jérémie Battaglia is a French Canadian director and cinematographer. He is best known for his documentary films Casseroles, Perfect (Parfaites) and The Brother (Le frère).

Career
Battaglia was first recognized for the musical documentary Casseroles, about the 2012 Quebec student protests.

In 2016, he directed the feature documentary Perfect (Parfaites), about the Canada's synchronized swimming team as they prepare for the 2016 Summer Olympics. In 2021, he directed the documentary short The Brother (Le frère), about a young boy living with muscular dystrophy.

His feature film The Sum of Our Dreams premiered at the FIFA festival in March 2022.

Filmography

Awards and nominations

References

External links

1983 births
Living people
Canadian documentary film directors
French documentary film directors
French emigrants to Quebec
Film directors from Montreal
Canadian cinematographers
People from Aix-en-Provence
French cinematographers